Ice Skating Australia is the governing body for the sport of Ice Skating in Australia.

Structure
The national body has eight state member associations.

References

External links
 

Sports governing bodies in Australia
National governing bodies for ice skating
International Skating Union
Winter sports in Australia